Geoffrey Webb (1898–1970) was a British art historian.

Geoffrey or Geoff Webb may also refer to:
 Geoffrey Webb (artist) (1879–1954), English stained-glass artist
 Geoffrey Webb (cricketer) (1896–1981), English cricketer
 Geoff Webb (born 1960), Australian computer scientist
 Geoffrey Webb, scriptwriter and collaborator of Edward J. Mason
 Geoff Webb, character in the Australian soap opera Home and Away

See also
 Jeff Webb (disambiguation)